Leida is a predominantly Estonian feminine given name.

As of 1 January 2021, 1,050 women in Estonia have the first name Leida, making it the 176th most popular female name in the country.    The name is most common in the 80+ age group, and most commonly found in Viljandi County, where 19.59 per 10,000 inhabitants of the county bear the name.   

Individuals bearing the name Leida include:

Leida Aru (1917–1999), Estonian actress and director
Leida Chirino (born 2000), Cuban footballer 
Leida Kibuvits (1907–1976), Estonian writer
Leida Kook (1912–2015), Estonian physician and professor
Leida Laius (1923–1996), Estonian film director
Leida Leivategija (1918–2004), Estonian entomologist and agricultural scientist
Leida Loone (1911–1969), Estonian historian and translator
Leida Rammo (1924–2020), Estonian actress
Leida Soom (1912–2009), Estonian opera singer, textile and ex-libris artist
Leida Tigane (1908–1983), Estonian children's writer and prose writer
Leida Tuulmets (1933–2021), Estonian mathematician

References

Feminine given names
Estonian feminine given names